Decomposers are organisms that break down dead or decaying organisms; they carry out decomposition, a process possible by only certain kingdoms, such as fungi. Like herbivores and predators, decomposers are heterotrophic, meaning that they use organic substrates to get their energy, carbon and nutrients for growth and development. While the terms decomposer and detritivore are often interchangeably used, detritivores ingest and digest dead matter internally, while decomposers directly absorb nutrients through external chemical and biological processes. Thus, invertebrates such as earthworms, woodlice, and sea cucumbers are technically detritivores, not decomposers, since they are unable to absorb nutrients without ingesting them.

Fungi 
The primary decomposer of litter in many ecosystems is fungi. Unlike bacteria, which are unicellular organisms and are decomposers as well, most saprotrophic fungi grow as a branching network of hyphae. While bacteria are restricted to growing and feeding on the exposed surfaces of organic matter, fungi can use their hyphae to penetrate larger pieces of organic matter, below the surface. Additionally, only wood-decay fungi have evolved the enzymes necessary to decompose lignin, a chemically complex substance found in wood. These two factors make fungi the primary decomposers in forests, where litter has high concentrations of lignin and often occurs in large pieces. Fungi decompose organic matter by releasing enzymes to break down the decaying material, after which they absorb the nutrients in the decaying material. Hyphae are used to break down matter and absorb nutrients and are also used in reproduction. When two compatible fungi hyphae grow close to each other, they will then fuse together for reproduction, and form another fungus.

See also 
Chemotroph
Micro-animals
Microorganism

References

Further reading 
 
 Hunt HW, Coleman DC, Ingham ER, Ingham RE, Elliot ET, Moore JC, Rose SL, Reid CPP, Morley CR (1987) "The detrital food web in a shortgrass prairie". Biology and Fertility of Soils 3: 57-68
 Smith TM, Smith RL (2006) Elements of Ecology. Sixth edition. Benjamin Cummings, San Francisco, CA.

Microbiology